Alan Basset (died 1232 or 1233) was an English baron.

Basset was a younger son of Adeliza and Thomas Basset of Headington, Oxfordshire. In like favour with Richard I and with John, he received from the former the lordships of Woking and Mapledurwell (in Surrey and Hampshire), and from the latter those of Wycombe and Berewick (in Buckinghamshire and Wiltshire).

With his brothers Gilbert and Thomas he accompanied John to Northampton, when the king of Scots did his homage (22 November 1200), which he tested, and continued throughout John's reign in close attendance on the court, accompanying the king to Ireland in 1210 and to Runnymede (15 June 1215), his name, with that of his brother Thomas, appearing in Magna Carta among those of the king's counsellors.

At the accession of Henry III he was one of the witnesses to his re-issue of the charter (11 November 1216), and on the royalist reaction his loyalty was rewarded by his being occasionally employed in the Curia Regis and sent to France on a political mission in 1219–20. He also acted as sheriff of Rutland from 1217 to 1229. Dying in 1232–3, he left three sons: Gilbert, his heir; Fulk, afterwards bishop of London; and Philip, afterwards Justiciar of England.

References

Year of birth missing
1230s deaths
13th-century English people
People from Oxfordshire
High Sheriffs of Rutland
Feudal barons of Wycombe